The nerve to the stapedius is a branch of the facial nerve (CN VII) which innervates the stapedius muscle. It arises from the CN VII within the facial canal, opposite the pyramidal eminence. It passes through a small canal in this eminence to reach the stapedius muscle.

References

External links
 

Facial nerve